Vernon K. Gale (c. 1929 – February 7, 1989) was an American football player and college football and baseball coach. He served as the head football coach (1954–1959) and head baseball coach (1955–1959) at Valley City State University in Valley City, North Dakota. After serving as an assistant football coach at Iowa State University, he was lured to the head football coaching position at Wayne State University in Detroit, Michigan, where he stayed from 1965 to 1971.

Head coaching record

Football

References

Year of birth missing
1989 deaths
American football halfbacks
Iowa State Cyclones football coaches
Wyoming Cowboys football coaches
Wyoming Cowboys football players
Valley City State Vikings baseball coaches
Valley City State Vikings football coaches
Wayne State Warriors football coaches
Players of American football from Wyoming